Deir Abu Mash'al is a Palestinian village in the Ramallah and al-Bireh Governorate, located  west of Ramallah in the northern West Bank. According to the Palestinian Central Bureau of Statistics (PCBS), the village had a population of approximately 3,522 inhabitants in 2007. Donde nació Ibrahim salem

Location
It is bordered by Al Itihad to the south and east, Abud to the east and north, and Shuqba to the west.

History
Sherds from the  Byzantine, Byzantine/Umayyad and Crusader/Ayyubid eras have been found here.

There is a wall at the highest part of the village, with cisterns below it, which is assumed to be the remains of the 12th century  Crusader castle named Bellifortis. It possibly belonged to the Hospitalliers in 1167.

The PEF's Survey of Western Palestine (SWP) visited the place (in 1873), and noted: "There are here indications of an important fort, apparently of Crusading times. A rock platform, roughly square, about 50 yards wide, occupies the top of the hill, and many well-cut stones, with rustic boss and a draft 3 inches wide, lie round. On the west is a wall of rubble faced with small ashlar, which stands over a rock scarp. On the north are traces of a similar wall. There is a small tank, well cemented, with a groined roof. There is also a large well near. A rock-cut drain some 6 inches wide leads towards the well. On the south
are rock-cut steps. On the east, quarries and two tanks, rock-cut, but roofed in with masonry. One measured 20 feet by 12 feet."  Modern opinion is that the remains are from a major Byzantine monastery, which had a Crusader tower added to it.

Sherds from the Mamluk era have also been found here.

Ottoman era
The population was 42 households, all Muslim. They paid a tax rate of 33.3% on agricultural products, which included wheat, barley,  olive trees, fruit trees, goats and beehives, in addition to "occasional revenues"; a total of 3,300 akçe. Sherds from the early Ottoman era have also been found here.

In 1838 Edward Robinson noted Deir Abu Mesh'al on his travels in the region, as a Muslim village,   located in the Beni Zeid district, north of Jerusalem.

In 1870, Victor Guérin found the village to have 450 inhabitants. He further noted: "At the highest point I notice, on a large platform, the traces of a powerful construction, some of which are still inferior, and which was built with beautiful cut stones of a magnificent device. Under this platform reigns a huge cistern dug into the rock. To the south stands a gigantic wall of very thick wall, but built with stones of a much lesser apparatus than those which constitute the lower courses of which I have just spoken. The houses in the village are roughly built, but almost all of them contain ancient materials. Near these Moslem dwellings lay on the leveled rock several areas, perhaps dating back to the earliest antiquity, and which the present fellahs still use to beat their barley or wheat."  An  Ottoman village list of about the same year, 1870, indicated 33 houses and a population of 159, though the population count included men, only.

In 1882, the PEF's Survey of Western Palestine (SWP) described Deir Abu Meshal as "A small and partly ruinous stone village in a very strong position on a lofty hill. [] A pool exists on the south side of the village, which supplies the place with water."

In 1896 the population of Der abu masch'al was estimated to be about 273 persons.

British Mandate era
In the 1922 census of Palestine, conducted by the British Mandate authorities, the village, named Dair Abu Masha'al, had a population of 289, all Muslim,  increasing in the 1931 census to 404 Muslim, in 88 inhabited houses.

Of this, 2,076 dunams were plantations and irrigable land, 1,058 used for cereals, while  were built-up (urban) land.

Jordanian era
In the wake of the 1948 Arab–Israeli War, and after the 1949 Armistice Agreements, Deir Abu Mash'al came under Jordanian rule.

The Jordanian census of 1961 found 987 inhabitants at Deir Abu Mash'al.

1967-present
Since the Six-Day War in 1967, Deir Abu Mash'al has been under Israeli occupation.

After the 1995 accords, 85% of village land was classified as Area B, and the remaining 15% as Area C. Israel has confiscated hundreds of dunams of land for bypass roads.

References

Bibliography

External links
Welcome To Dayr Abu Mash'al
Survey of Western Palestine, Map 14:   IAA,  Wikimedia commons  
Deir Abu Mash'al Village (Fact Sheet),  Applied Research Institute–Jerusalem (ARIJ)
 Deir Abu Mash'al Village Profile, ARIJ
Deir Abu Mash'al  aerial photo, ARIJ
Locality Development Priorities and Needs in Deir Abu Mash'al Village, ARIJ

Villages in the West Bank
Ramallah and al-Bireh Governorate
Municipalities of the State of Palestine